Jovan may refer to:

Jovan (given name), a list of people with this given name
Jovan, Mawal, a village on the western coastal region of Maharashtra, India
Jōvan Musk, a cologne
Deli Jovan, a mountain in eastern Serbia
Róbert Jován (born 1967), Hungarian footballer

See also
Jovanka (disambiguation)
Joven (disambiguation)
Javon (disambiguation)
Jovan Hill